Marilyn ('Lyn') Ossome is an academic, specialising in feminist political theory and feminist political economics. She is currently Senior Research Associate of at the University of Johannesburg and a member of the advisory board for the Strategic Initiative for Women in the Horn of Africa, amongst other accolades. She is an editorial board member of Agrarian South: Journal of Political Economy, and in 2021, she co-edited the volume Labour Questions in the Global South. She serves on the executive committee for the Council for the Development of Social Science Research in Africa (CODESRIA). She is the author of Gender, Ethnicity and Violence in Kenya’s Transitions to Democracy: States of Violence.

Biography 

Lyn Ossome was born and raised in Kenya. She holds a PhD in Political Studies from University of the Witwatersrand, Johannesburg. From 2016 to 2021 she was Senior Research Fellow at the Makerere Institute of Social Research, at Makerere University in Uganda. She describes her academic approach as 'a kind of activist-scholarship'.

Career 
Ossome's research focusses particularly on gendered labour, queer feminist history and gendered violence, as well as agrarian and land studies. Her work on feminism includes articles on Arab refugee women, Kenyan media and anti-rape discourse, and agrarian movements in Africa.

Her 2018 book Gender, Ethnicity and Violence in Kenya’s Transitions to Democracy: States of Violence examined 'the democratization process and sexual/gendered violence observed against women during electioneering periods in Kenya'. In 2021, she co-edited the volume Labour Questions in the Global South.

She is an editorial board member of Agrarian South: Journal of Political Economy, and serves on the advisory board of Feminist Africa.

In 2016, Ossome was a visiting scholar at the National Chiao Tung University in Taiwan. She was also Visiting Presidential Professor in Women's, Gender and Sexuality Studies at Yale University from 2016-17.

Ossome serves on the board of the International Association for Feminist Economics (IAFFE), and the executive committee of the Council for the Development of Social Science Research in Africa (CODESRIA).

Selected publications 

 Ossome, Lyn and Naidu, Srisha C (2021). 'Does Land Still Matter? Gender and Land Reforms in Zimbabwe'. Agrarian South: Journal of Political Economy. 10(2): 344–370 https://doi.org/10.1177/22779760211029176
 Ossome, Lyn (2021). 'Land in transition: from social reproduction of labour power to social reproduction of power' Journal of Contemporary African Studies. 39(4): 550-564. https://doi.org/10.1080/02589001.2021.1895431
 Ossome, Lyn (2021). 'The care economy and the state in Africa’s Covid-19 responses'. Canadian Journal of Development Studies / Revue canadienne d'études du développement, 42(1-2), 68-78.https://doi.org/10.1080/02255189.2020.1831448
 Ossome Lyn (2021). 'Pedagogies of Feminist Resistance: Agrarian Movements in Africa'. Agrarian South: Journal of Political Economy. 10(1):41-58. https://doi.org/10.1177/22779760211000939
 Ossome, Lyn and Naidu, Srisha C (2021). 'The Agrarian Question of Gendered Labour' in Labour Questions in the Global South. Palgrave Macmillan.
 Ossome, Lyn 'African Feminism' in Rabaka, R. (Ed.). (2020). Routledge Handbook of Pan-Africanism (1st ed.). Routledge. https://doi.org/10.4324/9780429020193

References 

Living people
Political scientists
Kenyan feminists
Feminist economists
Year of birth missing (living people)